Farah Asyikin binti Zulkifli (born 11 November 1979) is a Malaysian singer and songwriter, who placed third on the second season of Malaysian Idol and fifth on the first season of its replacement show One in a Million. Her self-titled debut album has just been released recently, featuring the hit singles such as Dari Sini Ke Bintang-Bintang and Get Happy.

One in a Million 
Throughout the entire competition, Farah sang:
 Pupus – Dewa19 (Top 20)
 Baby One More Time – Britney Spears (Top 12)
 Total Eclipse of the Heart – Bonnie Tyler (Top 10)
 Bilang Saja – Agnes Monica (Top 9)
 Time After Time- Cyndi Lauper (Top 8)
 Anytime You Need a Friend – Mariah Carey (Top 7)
 Takkan Ada Cinta Yang Lain - Dewa (Top 6)
 Tak Tercapai Akalmu - Elyana (Top 6)
 Trees - Marty Casey & The Lovehammers (Top 5)
 Unfaithful – Rihanna (Top 5)
 Superwoman - Karyn White (After elimination on Top 4 week)

Discography 

1999-2000 
Kembali Lagi Disisimu 
Lamunan Hati

2007 (album Farah Asyikin)
Hello 
Dari Sini Ke Bintang-Bintang 
Di Pangkuan Pilu 
1000 Penipuan 
Get Happy 
Bayangkanlah 
Sempurna 
Fantasi

2008-10 
Tak Ingin Akhiri 
Aku Ada Kamu ft Along Ezendy (OST Belukar) 
Kamu Aku Satu ft Shamrin Fotograf 
Adamu 
Penjagaku

2014
What's Going On 
Redhamu 
I'm Without You Allah

Cover Song 

*Fame - Irene Cara

*Since U Been Gone -Kelly Clarkson

*Breakaway - Kelly Clarkson

See also 
 One in a Million (Malaysian TV series)
 Faizal Tahir
 Suki Low
 Alif Satar

External links
 All About Farah (from One In A Million's official site)

1979 births
Living people
21st-century Malaysian women singers
One in a Million (Malaysian TV series) participants
Malay-language singers
Malaysian Idol participants